Homorthodes hanhami is a species of cutworm or dart moth in the family Noctuidae first described by William Barnes and James Halliday McDunnough in 1911. It is found in North America.

The MONA or Hodges number for Homorthodes hanhami is 10539.

Subspecies
Two subspecies belong to Homorthodes hanhami:
 Homorthodes hanhami hanhami g
 Homorthodes hanhami semicarnea Barnes & McDunnough, 1918 c g
Data sources: i = ITIS, c = Catalogue of Life, g = GBIF, b = BugGuide

References

Further reading

 
 
 

Eriopygini
Articles created by Qbugbot
Moths described in 1911